Jakob Streit (23 September 1910 in Spiez, Switzerland – 15 May 2009 in Spiez) was a Swiss author, teacher and anthroposophist. Besides this he worked as musician and choirmaster as well as conductor and dramaturg

Biography 

Jakob Streit was born in the Berner Oberland in Switzerland, the son of a watchmaker, and lived there for most of his life. He had four brothers and sisters and everyone helped to tend the family beehives, their cow and calf and their sheep.

He studied education at the teacher training college in Bern, where his skills in Music, Education and Literature were honed. His musical education he completed with Hans Klee, the father of artist Paul Klee, then began on a career as teacher of different age groups, in the course of which the many stories he told to the children were published as children's stories in over forty books. Many of these are translated into English and other languages. His educational method, and particularly his music instruction drew heavily on the indications of Rudolf Steiner on Waldorf education.

“When one has told stories to different age groups of children for 45 years on a daily basis, one learns a great deal from them, one is carried on the wings of Poetry, of the imagination. In later years, this interest grows into everything that is truly human. For example, this is how I came to write my first book about gnomes: A girl in the third grade brought a beautiful Edelweiss to my desk one morning, saying: “My father gave it to me and told me that, if you can tell us how the Edelweiss came about, you can keep it.” Quickly the children all sat down at their desks, for in their eyes the teacher of the third grade is capable of anything at all. Forty pairs of eyes are looking expectantly at you. (...) I began thoughtfully; soon there were gnomes and elves in the picture, finding magic ways to transform the stars of the night into the Edelweiss. Carried by the astonished eyes of the children, my story must have gone on for about 20 minutes. When the Edelweiss had finally been created, a little boy stood up and proclaimed: “Tomorrow you must deal with the Gentian.” In this manner, from day to day, we found our way through the different flowers of the mountains. I was not able to prepare at all. I needed the children to be there. Afterwards I wrote down the stories that had come about. They have been published as “Bergblumen Märchen” today with the publisher Oratio Verlag in Schaffhausen.”

After producing plays with children, he broadened his interest to amateur theatre direction, in the course of which he inaugurated the William Tell festival plays in Interlaken and the Spiez Castle Plays. Having studied Piano and Organ, his work as choir conductor led him to produce a succession of operas, amongst others The Magic Flute and Orpheus and Euridice.

Questions of Art, Art History and culture occupied him all his life and after his retirement he began to lecture in most of Europe besides increasing the scope of his literary work. For many years he was editor of the AVS-Mitteilungen, the newssheet of the Anthroposophische Vereinigung in der Schweiz, continuing with this until his death at 99 years of age.

References

Literary work

Books for Children and Young People 

And There Was Light – From the Creation of the World to Noah's Ark Jakob Streit; Translated by Ekkehard Piening AWSNA (Association of Waldorf Schools of North America) 2006 
Brother Francis – The Life of Francis of Assisi Jakob Streit, AWSNA (Association of Waldorf Schools of North America) 2013 
Geron and Virtus – A Fateful Encounter of Two Youths: A German and a Roman, Jakob Streit; Translated by Nina Kuettel AWSNA (Association of Waldorf Schools of North America) 2006 
Invisible Guardians – True Stories of Fateful Encounters Jakob Streit; Translated by Nina Kuettel AWSNA (Association of Waldorf Schools of North America) 2011 
Journey to the Promised Land – The Path of the People of Israel from Abraham's Calling to David's Dream Jakob Streit; Translated by Donald Samson AWSNA (Association of Waldorf Schools of North America) 1999 
Liputto – Stories of Gnomes and Trolls Jakob Streit; Translated by Nina J. Kuettel AWSNA (Association of Waldorf Schools of North America) 1999 
Little Bee Sunbeam Jakob Streit; Translated by Nina Kuettel AWSNA (Association of Waldorf Schools of North America) 2010 
Milon and the Lion Jakob Streit; Translated by Wolfgang Forsthofer and Auriol de Smidt. Floris Books 2011 
Puck the Gnome Jakob Streit; Translated by Nina Kuettel AWSNA (Association of Waldorf Schools of North America) 2004 
The Star Rider and Anna McLoon – Two Tales from Ireland Jakob Streit; Translated by Nina Kuettel AWSNA (Association of Waldorf Schools of North America) 2010 
We Will Build a Temple – The Path of Israel from King Solomon to John the Baptist Jakob Streit; Translated by Donald Samson AWSNA (Association of Waldorf Schools of North America) 2004 
What Animals Say to Each Other – 30 Nature Fables in Rhyme Jakob Streit; Kilian Beck AWSNA (Association of Waldorf Schools of North America) 2013 SBN 9781936367238
The Bee Book Jakob Streit AWSNA (Association of Waldorf Schools of North America) 2010 
Three Knight Tales Jakob Streit; Translated by Nina Kuettel AWSNA (Association of Waldorf Schools of North America) 2012 
Little Gnome Tenderroot by Jakob Streit, illustrated by Georges Feldmann and translated by Nina Keuttel. Waldorf Publications; 27 January 2014.  
Beatuslegenden. Troxler, Bern 1940
Kindheitslegenden. Troxler, Bern 1941
Tiergeschichten. Atlantis, Zürich 1941
Dreikönigsbuch. Troxler, Bern 1951
Bergblumenmärchen. Atlantis, Zürich 1954
Kleine Schöpfungsgeschichte. Novalis, Freiburg im Breisgau 1956
Die Söhne Kains. Novalis, Freiburg im Breisgau 1959
Die schöne Magelone. Schweizerisches Jugendschriftenwerk (SJW), Zürich 1960
Von Zwergen und Wildmannli. SJW, Zürich 1965
Rösli von Stechelberg. SJW, Zürich 1968
Beatus, ein irischer Glaubensbote. SJW, Zürich 1968
Ich will dein Bruder sein. Freies Geistesleben, Stuttgart 1979
Der erste Weihnachtsbaum. Erzählungen. Novalis, Freiburg im Breisgau 1983
Ziehet hin ins gelobte Land. Freies Geistesleben, Stuttgart 1983
Tatatucks Reise. Freies Geistesleben, Stuttgart 1984
Louis Braille. Ein blinder Junge erfindet die Blindenschrift. Freies Geistesleben, Stuttgart 1987
Geschichten vom Schenken und Helfen des Sankt Nikolaus. Freies Geistesleben, Stuttgart 1989
Miriam zu Betlehem. Freies Geistesleben, Stuttgart 1989
Ich will dein Bruder sein. Legende. Freies Geistesleben, Stuttgart 1989
Die Zauberflöte. Freies Geistesleben, Stuttgart 1991
Zwerg Wurzelfein. Urachhaus, Stuttgart 1992
Die Geschichte der zwei Jesusknaben. Die Pforte, Basel 1992
Im Rosenhaus. Urachhaus, Stuttgart 1992
Ajuk und die Eisbären. Freies Geistesleben, Stuttgart 1993
Das Osterlamm. Legende. Freies Geistesleben, Stuttgart 1993
Nagick, das Eichhörnchen. AT, Aarau 1993
Puck und der Regenbogen. Drei Zwerge besuchen das Menschenreich. Freies Geistesleben, Stuttgart 1996
Odilie. Botin des Lichts. Freies Geistesleben, Stuttgart 1997
Columban. Ein Kämpfer für das irische Christentum. Urachhaus, Stuttgart 2002
Königskind und Hirtenkind. Die Geschichte der beiden Jesusknaben. Urachhaus, Stuttgart 2003

Non-fiction 

Sun and Cross – From Megalithic Culture to Early Christianity in Ireland Jakob Streit; Translated by Hugh Latham, Floris Books 2004 
Erziehungskunst und Elternhaus. Die Kommenden, Freiburg im Breisgau 1954
Newly published as: Erziehung, Schule, Elternhaus. Erziehungsfragen und Erziehungshilfen. Novalis, Schaffhausen 1978
Das Märchen im Leben des Kindes. Brügger, Meiringen 1964
Neuausgabe als: Warum Kinder Märchen brauchen. Verlag am Goetheanum (Ogham-Bücherei 24), Dornach 1985
Waldorfpädagogik in öffentlichen Schulen. Herder, Freiburg im Breisgau 1976
Vom Werden der Welt. Novalis, Schaffhausen 1981
Comics oder Märchen? Gift oder Nahrung für die Seelen unserer Kinder (with Elisabeth Klein). Verein für ein erweitertes Heilwesen, Bad Liebenzell 2. A. 1984

Other 

Therese Keller – Porträt einer Puppenspielerin (as editor). Zytglogge, Gümligen 1974
Anna Samweber: Aus meinem Leben (as editor). Die Pforte, Basel 1981
Parzival. Der Weg zum heiligen Gral. Retold by Jakob Streit to illustrations by Werner Diedrich. Die Pforte, Basel 1997
Wegspuren. Poetry. Pforte, Dornach 2000

Radio Plays and Broadcasts 

Beatus, ein irischer Glaubensbote. Radio DRS, Bern 1950
Der vierte König. DRS, Bern 1952
Clara von Rappard. DRS, Bern 1957

Plays
Rösli vom Stechelberg. The Freie Marionettenbühne Wengen performs this as a puppet play in 4 acts, Premiere 25 December 2002.

External links 
 Own Homepage
 
 Entry for Jakob Streit in the Author's Association of Switzerland

German-language writers
Swiss writers
Anthroposophists
1910 births
2009 deaths